Glugea is a genus of microsporidian parasites, predominantly infecting fish.

Species include

 Glugea anomala
 Glugea atherinae
 Glugea capverdensis - a parasite of the fish Myctophum punctatum
 Glugea caulleryi - a parasite of the greater sand eel Hyperoplus lanceolatus (a teleost fish)
 Glugea heraldi - a parasite of the seahorse Hippocampus erectus 
 Glugea hertwigi - a parasite of the smelts Osmerus eperlanus and Osmerus mordax
 Glugea merluccii - a parasite of the fish Merluccius hubbsi
 Glugea nagelia - a parasite of the yellowfin hind, Cephalopholis hemistiktos
 Glugea plecoglossi
 Glugea sardinellensis - a parasite of fish of the genus Sardinella
 Glugea shiplei - a parasite of fish of the genus Trisopterus
 Glugea stephani - a parasite of the winter flounder Pseudopleuronectes americanus (a pleuronectid flatfish)
 Glugea vincentiae - a parasite of the Australian marine teleost fish, Vincentia conspersa
 Glugea weissenbergi

References

Microsporidia genera
Parasites of fish